"Spindrift" is a song by the Canadian progressive rock band Rush. It was released on their 2007 album Snakes & Arrows. Although it was released as the second single from the album, the song failed to debut on any commercial chart.

Lyrical background
According to drummer and lyricist Neil Peart, the lyrics to "Spindrift" use sea-weather imagery as a metaphor for a lover's quarrel.

See also
List of Rush songs

Footnotes

2007 singles
2007 songs
Rush (band) songs
Songs written by Alex Lifeson
Songs written by Geddy Lee
Songs written by Neil Peart
Song recordings produced by Nick Raskulinecz
Atlantic Records singles